Mary Jo Sanders (born January 13, 1974, in Auburn Hills, Michigan) is a female professional boxer.  She is also daughter of NFL Hall of Famer, Charlie Sanders.

In a highly anticipated bout in 2008 with Holly Holm, a fight in which Sanders was favored to win, Holm won via decision.  The two had a rematch four months later and fought to a draw.  It was the last time Sanders fought.  Her record is 25 wins, 8 by knockout, with 1 defeat, and 1 draw.

Professional boxing record

References

External links

1974 births
World boxing champions
Living people
Boxers from Michigan
World welterweight boxing champions
American women boxers
People from Auburn Hills, Michigan